The American thrash metal band Toxic Holocaust recorded several demos throughout their career.

Radiation Sickness
The band's first demo released in 1999 under Nuclear Hell Records. It was originally released on cassette tape (later re-released on CD) and limited to only 40 copies.

Track listing

Critical Mass
The band's second demo released in April 2002 under Nuclear Hell Records. Originally limited to 333 copies.

Track listing

Promo 2004
The band's third demo released on October 12, 2004, independently.

Track listing

Demo 2007
The band's most recent demo released in 2008 under Relapse Records. All songs (excluding "Funeral Tomb") were later released on the band's 2008 album An Overdose of Death....

Track listing

References

Demo albums
Toxic Holocaust albums
Lists of albums by artist